Gynandromyia is a genus of flies in the family Tachinidae.

Species
G. bafwankei Verbeke, 1962
G. basilewskyi Verbeke, 1960
G. habilis Brauer & von Bergenstamm, 1891
G. invagimata Villeneuve, 1939
G. kibatiana Verbeke, 1962
G. longicornis Sun & Zhao, 1992
G. mesnili Verbeke, 1962
G. prima Verbeke, 1962
G. saegeri Verbeke, 1962
G. seychellensis Bezzi, 1923

References

Diptera of Africa
Diptera of Asia
Exoristinae
Tachinidae genera
Taxa named by Mario Bezzi